{{DISPLAYTITLE:C18H24N2O4}}
The molecular formula C18H24N2O4 (molar mass: 332.39 g/mol, exact mass: 332.1736 u) may refer to:

 Ancarolol
 Isoxaben (N-[3-(1-ethyl-1-methylpropyl)-1,2-oxazol-5-yl]-2,6-dimethoxybenzamide)